Big Break was a British television game show, created by Roger Medcalf, Mike Kemp and Terry Mardell, presented by comedian Jim Davidson and snooker commentator John Virgo, and broadcast on BBC One between 1991 and 2002. Inspired by ITV's Bullseye, the programme focuses on teams consisting of a contestant and a profesional snooker player competing in rounds that involve snooker, with the best team eventually seeing its player seeking to win prizes for their contestant. The series was notable for often featuring a unique round involving trick shots, and the chemistry between Davidson and Virgo.

Creation
Seeking to create a new game show for the BBC, Roger Medcalf, Mike Kemp and Terry Mardell came together to determine an ideal format to propose to the broadcaster. The group eventually opted for a game show centered around snooker, partly inspired by ITV's Bullseye. A pilot for the programme was filmed in May 1990, given the name Big Break, with the creators assigning actor Mike Reid as host, with snooker player and commentator John Parrott as his assistant. The pilot was not broadcast, after Michael Checkland, the BBC's Director-General at the time, raised concerns about the format being too similar to Bullseye, along with having doubts that Reid and Parrott lacking the right 'double-act' relationship for television.

A second pilot, which was not intended for broadcast, was filmed several months later with significant changes – the biggest being comedian Jim Davidson serving as host. To find the right assistant for him, the decision was made to have the producer, John Burrowes, assess two candidates for Davidson's assistant: Parrott; and professional snooker player and commentator John Virgo. Ultimately, Virgo was see as the ideal partner for Davidson, allowing for the show to be green-lit by the BBC. Although the second pilot was never broadcast, an out-take from it later featured in an episode of Auntie's Bloomers. A one-off special was filmed with the intention of it being aired during December 1990 so as to introduce the game show, but the production company opted to instead premiere Big Break in April 1991; the resulting decision meant that the special had to be re-edited, leading to some inconsistencies when it was first broadcast. To emphazie the game show's link to snooker, the producers opted for using "The Snooker Song", from the musical The Hunting of the Snark composed by Mike Batt and performed by Captain Sensible.

Format
In each episode of the game show, three contestants are each paired up with a professional snooker player – while the contestant tackles questions given by the host, the player handles the snooker-based challenges in each round. Although a game show, Davidson and Virgo usually interject comedy into each episode, including a brief stand-up routine at the beginning of an episode before the introduction of the contestants and players. Although the first two rounds have their own rules, the last two stick to traditional regulation snooker rules regarding potting balls – colours being potted only after a red is potted – although with six red balls used in these rounds.

The programme features four rounds:
 Red Hot – Each contestant is given three questions, in which their answer denotes the amount of time their snooker player has to pot as many of the ten red balls on the snooker table as they possibly can. The player is allowed to break before time begins, meaning that any red balls that are potted in this period counts towards their final score. In early series, players were given 10 seconds, with each correct answer a contestant gave adding an additional 10 seconds. By later series, the format was changed, with the player having 40 seconds, minus five seconds to any incorrect answers the contestant gave. The team with the lowest score are eliminated at the end of the round.
 Virgo's Trick Shot – A mini-game styled round, in which the contestant eliminated in the first round is given the opportunity to win a consolation prize. Virgo demonstrates a type of trick shot, which the contestant must recreate themselves, in order to win the prize.
 Pocket Money – Each contestant's player tackles a traditional game of snooker (although there are only six red balls on the table), along standard rules of potting, getting as many balls as they can within 90 seconds. Each ball on the table is denoted with both a cash amount – based on their regulation point in Snooker (i.e. Reds being one point are thus earn £10 when potted) – and a category of questions that Davidson can asks the contestants. If the player pots a ball in the same coloured pocket, the cash amount earned is doubled (i.e. potting Pink in its pocket doubles the amount from £60 to £120). If the player hits a ball but fails to pot it, they must stop and wait until their contestant answers a question correctly, based on the ball's connected subject, in order to resume, with the timer not stopped during this period. A coin toss decides which team begins first, with the team with the lowest score being eliminated at the end of the round.
 Make or Break – The final contestant is given 90 seconds to answer five questions correctly, after the player breaks the six reds on the table. Once all questions are answered, the timer is paused, with each correct answer allowing the player to remove one red ball from the table, leaving a minimum of one red left. Once their choices are made, if possible, the player begins potting balls in the remainder of the 90 seconds. Each coloured ball, when potted in order, offers the contestant a prize, with the grand prize won when the black is finally potted. However, the player must pot all the reds, before they can begin with the next colour in the sequence. If the black isn't potted, the contestant leaves with the money earned in Pocket Money, plus the red prize, and the highest coloured prize achieved when the time ran out.

Transmissions

Regular

Stars of the Future

Specials

References

External links
 
 
 

1990s British game shows
1990s British sports television series
2000s British game shows
2000s British sports television series
1991 British television series debuts
2002 British television series endings
BBC television game shows
English-language television shows
Snooker on television
Snooker in the United Kingdom
Television shows shot at BBC Elstree Centre